The 2022/23 FIS Freestyle Ski World Cup, organized by the International Ski Federation is the 51st World Cup in freestyle skiing for men and women. The season started on 21 October 2022 in Chur, Switzerland and will conclude on 25 March 2023 in Silvaplana, Switzerland. This season included six disciplines: moguls, aerials, ski cross, halfpipe, slopestyle and big air.

Men

Calendar

Ski Cross (SX)

Moguls (MO)

Dual Moguls (DM)

Aerials (AE)

Halfpipe (HP)

Slopestyle (SS)

Big Air (BA)

Standings

Ski Cross

Ski Cross Alps Tour

Overall Moguls

Moguls

Dual Moguls

Aerials

Park & Pipe Overall (HP/SS/BA)

Halfpipe

Slopestyle

Big Air

Women

Calendar

Ski Cross (SX)

Moguls (MO)

Dual Moguls (DM)

Aerials (AE)

Halfpipe (HP)

Slopestyle (SS)

Big Air (BA)

Standings

Ski Cross

Ski Cross Alps Tour

Overall Moguls

Moguls

Dual Moguls

Aerials

Park & Pipe Overall (HP/SS/BA)

Halfpipe

Slopestyle

Big Air

Team

Ski Cross Team (SXT)

Team Aerials (AET)

Nations Cup

Overall

Podium table by nation 
Table showing the World Cup podium places (gold–1st place, silver–2nd place, bronze–3rd place) by the countries represented by the athletes.

References 

FIS Freestyle Skiing World Cup
World Cup
World Cup
Freestyle
2023 in Canadian sports